Rafael Montero (born 12 July 1913, date of death unknown) was a Chilean cyclist. He competed in the individual and team road race events at the 1936 Summer Olympics.

References

External links
 

1913 births
Year of death missing
Chilean male cyclists
Olympic cyclists of Chile
Cyclists at the 1936 Summer Olympics
Place of birth missing